The Greek Rugby League Federation (GRLF), formerly Greek Rugby League Association (GRLA), has been governing body for the sport of rugby league football in Greece since 2017. Officially eecognised as Federation from the Greek Ministry of Sports in August 2022.

History
The GRLA was formed in 2017 following the expulsion of the Hellenic Federation of Rugby League from the Rugby League European Federation (now European Rugby League) the previous year. The body was accorded observer status with the RLEF in March 2017, and affiliate status in March 2018.

In August 2022 the GRLA was finally recognised as the official body for the sport from the Greek state and received the national federation status.  This recognition brought to an end the situation where the national team played 'home' fixtures abroad or in secret. The first international home game of the national team (women) took place in October 2022 at Gorytsa Park field, Aspropyrgos.

See also
 Rugby league in Greece
 Greece national rugby league team (men)
 Greece national rugby league team (women)

References

External links

Rugby league governing bodies in Europe
Rugby league in Greece
Rugby League
Sports organizations established in 2017